Anton Abad Chavarria (born 1958 in Saidi, Baix Cinca) is a poet and the best known Catalan singer-songwriter in the Aragon region of Spain. His discography includes Avui és un dia com un altre (Today it is a day like any other, 1989), Lo ball de la polseguera (The dance of the dust cloud, 1991), Cap problema (Any problem, 1995) Soc de poble (I'm from a village, 2002) and A la corda fluixa (To the tightrope, 2004). Many of his poems can be found in the anthology Joglars de frontera (Minstrels of the border, 1997), edited by Màrio Sasot.

References

Living people
1958 births
People from Bajo Cinca